Pelicans, London Zoological Gardens is a 1896 French short black-and-white silent actuality film, produced by Auguste and Louis Lumière and directed by Alexandre Promio, featuring pelicans following their keeper around their enclosure at London Zoological Gardens. The film was part of a series, including Lion and Tigers, which were one of the earliest examples of animal life on film.

See also
 Pelicans at the Zoo, 1898 film

References

French black-and-white films
French silent short films
Films about birds
Films set in zoos
Pelicans
1896 short films
1890s French films
Films shot in London